Spławie may refer to the following places:
Spławie, part of the district of Nowe Miasto in Poznań
Spławie, Konin County in Greater Poland Voivodeship (west-central Poland)
Spławie, Kościan County in Greater Poland Voivodeship (west-central Poland)
Spławie, Kuyavian-Pomeranian Voivodeship (north-central Poland)
Spławie, Września County in Greater Poland Voivodeship (west-central Poland)
Spławie, Sławno County in West Pomeranian Voivodeship (north-west Poland)
Spławie, Stargard County in West Pomeranian Voivodeship (north-west Poland)